The 1947 All-Eastern football team consists of American football players chosen by various selectors as the best players at each position among the Eastern colleges and universities during the 1947 college football season.

All-Eastern selections

Backs
 Frank R. Burns, Rutgers (AP-1)
 Gene Rossides, Columbia (AP-1)
 Skip Minisi, Penn (AP-1)
 Rowan, Army (AP-1)

Ends
 Bill Swiacki, Columbia (AP-1)
 Bill Iannicelli, Franklin & Marshall (AP-1)

Tackles
 Richard E. Shimshak, Navy (AP-1)
 Bill Lilienthal, Villanova (AP-1)

Guards
 Steve Suhey, Penn State (AP-1)
 Joe Steffy, Army (AP-1)

Centers
 Chuck Bednarik, Penn (AP-1)

Key
 AP = Associated Press

See also
 1947 College Football All-America Team

References

All-Eastern
All-Eastern college football teams